Paul Adams (born August 1951) is an American musician, writer and musical instrument builder.

Early career
Adams began his foray into the arts by making stringed musical instruments such as guitars, banjos, basses, and dulcimers after he was introduced to the craft as an ethnomusicology student under Dr. Joel Maring at Southern Illinois University Carbondale. Adams has been commissioned to build instruments by Daryl Hall, members of Stevie Wonder's band as well as other well known musicians. He has twelve albums out in multiple genres and can be heard on Siriusxm music, Music Choice, Apple Music, Spotify and Pandora Radio where he has over 101 million streams. In May 2016 his most recent album, Imaginings, won Best Contemporary Instrumental Album of the year at the Zone Music Reporter Awards in New Orleans. The follow up album Deeper Imaginings, a collaboration with Australian musician  was released in November 2019. In July 2022 Adams and Geyer released the album Sanctuary. The goal was to provide music to sooth those in need of stress management and meditation. An emphasis was also on yoga. The New Age Music Guide in Belgium Charted Sanctuary # 1 in July 2022. SANCTUARY is regularly played on Music Choice Soundscapes as well as  The Spa on Siriusxm and Public Radio's long running show [[ECHOES]]. 

After nearly 35 years of hiding Adams decided to release his lyric oriented music roughly in the "Americana" genre. To keep from confusing his new age audience he used the name PD Adams. The album is THIS CURIOUS WONDER. A rather existential look at the world around us. Americana Highways Magazine in Nashville writes “PD Adams new album This Curious Wonder is newly released and wholly beautiful. Channeling a stillness that honors true teachers like Thich Nhat Hanh, this is a deeply lovable album."

Composing
In the 1980s, Adams decided to start composing music and got a label deal with Nature Recordings/World Disc (now defunct). His first album, Various Waves, was placed in the Top Five of the Year by the syndicated Radio Show Musical Starstreams in the 1990s. The Metro Silicon Valley stated that "Adams is perhaps the most important New Age musician since George Winston."

Adams left the label after his first release in order to produce music in genres other than New Age. He spent some time working with John Golden of Centerfield Productions, whose main focus was the band jazz band Steps Ahead. Centerfield (now defunct) re-released Adams' second album, Wonder Dancing on Global Bop. After Centerfield folded, Adams took back control of his music.

In Tower Records' Pulse!, John Diliberto, the host of the Echoes radio program, called Adams' guitar playing on Wonder Dancing on Global Bop "Willfully eclectic with scintillating fretwork immersed in Latin African rhythms."

Adams' eight other album titles would fit in genres such as jazz, world fusion, acoustic, ambient, and eclectic. He has said that staying confined to one music style does hurt the connection to an audience. But he feels making variations of one style would be like a painter painting sea shores for an entire career. The Property of Water was completed using computer music pioneer Laurie Spiegel's intelligent computer music program called The Music Mouse (now out of production). It was then blended with Adams' acoustic built instruments as well as personally recorded sounds in nature. Laurie commented it was a "wondrous blend of silicon and wood". A View From the Plain is an aural painting of the land utilizing finger style guitar and all acoustic instruments such as Guitar, Dulcimer, Fiddle, Banjo and Dobro. In The Land Where I Come From was a venting of lyric compositions bathed in pop, jazz, and poetic recitations. This Christmas also focused on traditional holiday tunes supported with similar instrumentation found on A View From the Plain. He followed with three albums utilizing exotic world instrumentation and Native American and Indian flutes that are aimed for those wanting to slow down the pace of our world (Flute Meditations For Dreaming Clouds, Heavens, and Sleep). The album Sleep won Native American album of the year at the Zone Music Reporter awards in New Orleans in 2013. His album Imaginings won Zone Music Reporter Contemporary album of the year in 2016. It was a foray in to world music with Pravin Godkhindi, the wondrous Australian musician Elizabeth Geyer, and David Hoffman. A follow up album entitled Deeper Imaginings, a collaboration with Elizabeth Geyer was released in November 2019. It was nominated New Age album of the year by the Independent Music Awards.  Also on the album is Pravin Godkhindi, former Gentle Giant guitarist Gary Green and Alp Akmaz on Balabad (An beautiful instrument that sounds similar to the Daduk).

Producing
Adams also works as a producer and was part of the production team that released independent music titles by David Hoffman, the trumpet soloist and occasional arranger for The Ray Charles Orchestra until Charles' death. Adams started a sideline band called THE NEURONS with Hoffman that focused on more aggressive and exotic improvised ethnic music designed to work with multimedia. They worked extensively with The Illinois Ballet and live dance.

Hobbies
Adams is also a poet and has utilized poetic readings in some of his music. He has also worked as a writer on various subjects such as mental health issues, as well as philosophical and spiritual topics. He has interviewed such artists as Tony Levin and Kazu Matsui for various independent publications.

Adams cites his experience working in the mental health profession along with his music as being his deepest artistic influence.

Discography
 1990 - Various Waves
 1993 - Wonder Dancing on Global Bop
 1994 - A View From the Plain
 1996 - In the Land Where I Come From
 1997 - The Property of Water
 2003 - This Christmas
 2004 - Flute Meditations For Dreaming Clouds
 2004 - Dance
 2010 - Heavens
 2013 - Sleep the dreaming flute
 2015 - Imaginings

Played on:

Wet Dark and Low by Kit Watkins
From Energy to Stillness by David Hoffman
Christmas in Your Heart by David Hoffman
The Web Craig Peyton
The Bridge  by Australian Elizabeth Geyer

References

External links
 

1951 births
Living people
Musicians from Indiana
New-age musicians